uMhlanga, alternatively rendered Umhlanga, is a residential, commercial and resort town north of Durban on the coast of KwaZulu-Natal, South Africa. It is part of the eThekwini Metropolitan Municipality, which was created in 2000 and includes the greater Durban area. The name means "place of reeds" in the Zulu language, and the correct pronunciation of "hl" in uMhlanga is similar to the Welsh "ll".

It is well known for the Gateway Theatre of Shopping, the largest shopping mall in the Southern Hemisphere. It also has the second-tallest skyscraper in South Africa, Pearl Sky, at 183 m. uMhlanga is one of the fastest-growing towns in South Africa; its population increased 57.5% from 15,387 in the 2001 census to 24,238 in the 2011 census.

History 

uMhlanga derives its name from the Zulu language and means "place of reeds", referring to the beds of reeds growing along the Ohlanga River north of uMhlanga Rocks.

The Oyster Box, a luxury hotel since the 1950s, was built as a beach cottage in 1869, before the town had even been founded.

In 1895, Sir Marshall Campbell founded uMhlanga. The town's first hotel was established in 1920, followed by a shop, a lighthouse, the Natal Anti Shark Measures Board (today called the KwaZulu-Natal Sharks Board) and further hotel developments.

The Borough of uMhlanga was formed on 1 August 1972 through the amalgamation of uMhlanga Rocks, a seaside resort town, and the suburb of La Lucia. Mr Rodney Rindel, former chairman of the La Lucia town board, was elected to mayor of the newly formed Borough of uMhlanga. Mr Rindel said that the people of La Lucia had made no secret that they were opposed to the amalgamation and were not happy with the name, but now that this had come about they would make the best of it. 

In the 1980s, development expanded inland growing from a small village east of the M4 highway to a large town occupying most of the area east of N2 highway and south of the Hawaan Forest. The Greater Durban metropolis is seeing expansion into areas near the Hawaan forest to the north which is the natural habitat of many creatures such as the vervet monkey. The monkeys often venture into the greater city in search of food from residents and unsuspecting tourists.

Spelling change 

In November 2009, the eThekwini Metropolitan Municipality submitted a list of places in the municipality to the KwaZulu-Natal Provincial Geographic Names Committee to be changed from their anglicised names to the correct Zulu spelling. In the list, the town "Umhlanga Rocks" was to be changed to "uMhlanga Rocks" which meant the '"u" in the spelling would change from an uppercase to a lowercase. On 1 October 2010, the KwaZulu-Natal Department of Arts and Culture gazetted the list of approved name changes which included the town of Umhlanga (Rocks).

Ever since the name change, the South African National Roads Agency Ltd. (SANRAL) has changed the road signs on the N2 leading to and at the Mt Edgecombe Interchange as well as some road signs on the M41 however there are still several road signs that still remain with the spelling "Umhlanga" and many Durbanites and residents and businesses still spell the town with its previous spelling.

Geography 
uMhlanga is located on a large hill overlooking the Indian Ocean at what is regarded as the gateway to the KwaZulu-Natal North Coast and in the Northern Municipal Planning Region of eThekwini.

uMhlanga is situated approximately 16 km north-east of Durban’s city centre and 12 km south-east of the King Shaka International Airport. It is bordered by the uMhlanga Lagoon Nature Reserve to the north, the Indian Ocean to the east, Durban North to the south and Mount Edgecombe to the west.

Unlike many towns in South Africa which have one central business district (CBD), uMhlanga has two CBDs. The older and initial CBD is in uMhlanga Rocks concentrated in the precicnt around Lighthouse Road, Chartwell Drive and Lagoon Drive. Although being the older CBD, the uMhlanga Rocks CBD has become increasingly modernised with new developments.

The newer and more modern CBD is the uMhlanga Ridge Town Centre in uMhlanga Ridge which is centered around the Gateway Theatre of Shopping and includes several modern apartments and office spaces.

Suburban areas 

The suburbs of uMhlanga Ridge, Prestondale, Izinga, La Lucia Ridge, Somerset Park and Sunningdale are all located on the ridge/the top of the hill. Ridgeside, Herrwood Park and the western part of uMhlanga Rocks lie on the upper slope of the hillside, La Lucia stretches across the entire hillside from the ridge till M4 at the lower hillside and uMhlanga Rocks lies on the lower slope/foot of the hillside along the coastline.

uMhlanga consists of 10 suburban areas including:

Herrwood Park 

Herrwood Park is an affluent residential suburb on the hillside of uMhlanga overlooking the Indian Ocean and located below Izinga development on the ridge and above uMhlanga Rocks. It is bordered by the M4 to the east and the Hawaan Forest/uMhlanga Lagoon Nature Reserve to the north.

Izinga 

Izinga is a new upmarket estate development located on the ridge above Herrwood Park and uMhlanga Rocks with residences designed with a uniform Mediterranean/Balinese form. It is bordered by the Hawaan Forest/uMhlanga Lagoon Nature Reserve to the north, Herrwood Park to the east, Prestondale to the south and the N2 to the west.

La Lucia  

A formerly independent suburb, La Lucia is located on the southern boundary of uMhlanga with Durban North and is located on a hillside below the ridge of Somerset Park overlooking the Indian Ocean. La Lucia is one of the most upmarket suburbs of Greater Durban. In 2017, according to property agency, Private Property, La Lucia was ranked as the 2nd most expensive suburb in Greater Durban after the neighbouring Mt Edgecombe Country Club Estate.

La Lucia Ridge 

La Lucia Ridge Office Estate is an office estate bordering south of the M41, adjacent to uMhlanga Ridge and between La Lucia and Somerset Park. The office estates comprises 10 smaller office parks which include small and major corporations such as the headquarters for Unilever South Africa, Aspen Pharmacare, SA Home Loans and Consumer Relief, the regional offices for Multichoice, Sappi, Sanlam, Liquid Telecom and Deloitte, Momentum and the German Honorary Consulate for Durban.

Prestondale 

Prestondale is a small suburb located on the ridge between uMhlanga Ridge to the south and Woodlands to the north. Prestondale is the location of the most prestigious school in uMhlanga, Reddam House uMhlanga which is a private school offering the Cambridge Assessment international.

Ridgeside 
Formerly sugarcane fields, Ridgeside is a new office node situated on a hill overlooking the Indian Ocean.

Ridgeside combines office estate, commercial, mixed-use, residential, leisure developments and managed open spaces. The node is home to business' regional offices in KwaZulu-Natal such as Investec, eNCA, Vodacom.

Somerset Park 

Somerset Park is a residential suburb located adjacent to uMhlanga Ridge and on the ridge above La Lucia and bordered by the N2 to the west, the M41 to the north and the M12 to the east. Somerset Park's residences are notably uniform with their design and green roofs similarly to Mt Edgecombe Country Club Estate opposite the N2.

Sunningdale 
Sunningale is a residential suburb located on the southern boundary of uMhlanga with Durban North on the ridge above La Lucia. Sunningdale is bordered by the N2 to the west and the M12 to the east.

uMhlanga Rocks 

uMhlanga Rocks also known as uMhlanga Village is the oldest part of uMhlanga and is the initial coastal village before other extensions up the hill developed. The coastal village has many luxury hotels and apartments right on the beach, including the Cabana Beach Hotel, the Beverly Hills Hotel, the Oyster Box Hotel, the uMhlanga Sands Hotel and Pearls of uMhlanga apartments. Many of these have views of the landmark lighthouse. It has a large increase in population during the summer months.

uMhlanga Ridge 

uMhlanga Ridge is a new retail, office and residential node situated on a hill overlooking the Indian Ocean. It was largely developed on sugarcane land by property development company, Moreland Estates, owned by the Tongaat Hulett sugar group. Located on the ridge are Gateway Theatre of Shopping and other shopping centres, motor dealerships, a private hospital and many offices.

uMhlanga Ridge Town Centre is connected by a series of pedestrian-friendly roads, parks and public spaces. The Town Centre is easily accessed by a network of major roads, including the N2.

The uMhlanga Ridge New Town Centre has been under construction for almost a decade. Vela VKE consulted on the structural input for the design of the grade separation bridge and two parking court structures. Civil infrastructure costs amount to R200 million to date.

Economy

Companies
Most companies- large and small- headquartered in the uMhlanga are mainly financial and investment institutions, legal professionals, logistics and shipping, technological and consumer-related institutions.

Some of the most notable companies headquartered in the town include one of the largest pharmaceutical companies in South Africa, Aspen Pharmacare, software provider, BET Software, debt councillors, Consumer Relief, sports betting company, Hollywoodbets, one of Africa's largest providers of technology, media, telecommunications and finance services, Ignition Group, one of South Africa's largest sugar producers, Illovo Sugar, shark awareness and control board for KwaZulu-Natal, KZN Shark Board, medical aid scheme, National Independent Medical Aid Society, financial provider, SA Home Loans and multinational consumer goods company, Unilever South Africa.

Economic development

uMhlanga, specifically the former sugarcane fields of uMhlanga Ridge, has become the focus of development in the Greater Durban area developing into one of Greater Durban's economic hubs due to many businesses relocating offices from Durban CBD (similarly to Sandton forming the new centre of Johannesburg), a move that has been criticized for "fragmenting the urban fabric" and furthering "the new apartheid" in Greater Durban. The opening of the King Shaka International Airport in La Mercy, near uMhlanga in 2010, replacing the Durban International Airport, south of Durban was one of the main factors that triggered the fast growing development in uMhlanga.

Due to the economic boom in the uMhlanga area as well as the new airport located nearby, various developments are under way which will substantially increase the population over the next two decades.

About  up the coast will be the luxury Aerotropolis known as the Sibaya Coastal Precinct inland to eMdloti It is estimated that it will cost R25-50 billion to develop and will. It will include around 9000 houses as well as numerous social and public facilities.

The new uMhlanga Ridge Town Centre has seen major expansion with many apartment complexes and businesses being built. The estimated R25 billion Cornubia development is being built across the N2 from the new town centre and will include 24000 low and middle income houses. In late 2017 the R1,8 billion Cornubia Mall opened to the public.

In the uMhlanga Village, the final phase of the Pearls of Umhlanga, Pearl Sky was completed in 2017 which includes a shopping mall. Adjacent and inland of the Pearls of Umhlanga on Lagoon Drive, the Oceans uMhlanga development has already seen the opening of its 5-star Radisson Blu Hotel tower in June 2022 and it's new luxury shopping centre, Oceans Mall in November 2022. At a price of R3,1 billion The Oceans uMhlanga development is the largest private sector investment in South African history narrowly beating the Pearls of Umhlanga at R3,0 billion.

Retail 

uMhlanga is one of the largest retail nodes in Greater Durban with a large concentration of shopping centres, motor delearships and other retail facilities.

The most notable and largest shopping centre is the Gateway Theatre of Shopping, the largest shopping centre in Greater Durban and KwaZulu-Natal and the third largest in South Africa. Gateway is amongst the most popular shopping centers in Greater Durban and opened in September 2001.

Other shopping centres in uMhlanga include:

 The Crescent at Umhlanga Ridge is located on uMhlanga Ridge adjacent to Gateway and is sandwiched between the N2 highway, M41 highway, Millennium Way and Meridian Drive.
 La Lucia Mall, one of the largest shopping centres in uMhlanga is located in La Lucia adjacent the M4 highway.
 Pearls Mall is a shopping centre located on the lower level of the luxury apartments of the Pearls of Umhlanga in uMhlanga Rocks.
 Oceans Mall, which opened recently on 15 November 2022 is a newly developed luxury shopping centre located on the lower level of the Oceans uMhlanga development consisting of the Radisson Blu Hotel and the luxury apartments of the Oceans uMhlanga.
 Umhlanga Centre is a small shopping centre located on Ridge Road on uMhlanga Rocks and adjacent the M4 highway.

The neighbouring development of Cornubia also includes the newly developed Cornubia Mall, one of the largest malls north of Durban and serves uMhlanga and its surroundings such as Mt Edgecombe, Phoenix, Verulam and eMdloti.

Tourism 

uMhlanga along with Durban North, Mount Edgecombe, Verulam, oThongathi, eMdloti, La Mercy and Westbrook form the uMhlanga Coast or the FunShine Coast which stretches from the uMngeni River in the south to the uThongathi River in the north. Although Durban Tourism is the main tourism board for eThekwini/Greater Durban as a Metro, uMhlanga Rocks Tourism is the tourism board which assists in marketing and promoting the northern region of Greater Durban.

uMhlanga is one of the most popular tourist destinations in South Africa. There were 1.2 million visitors in 2015 which generated a GDP of R20-billion.  In 2016, the tourism chairman Peter Rose said “I can confidently say that within the next five years you will not recognise uMhlanga,” Residents of uMhlanga have mixed feelings about the changes such as that it is losing its village appeal while they appreciate the new infrastructure and increased property values.

Hospitality 
With uMhlanga being a major seaside resort within KwaZulu-Natal and South Africa at large, majority of its economy is made up of the tourism industry. Signs of this can be found on the coastline where several hotels and holiday accommodation apartments lie, with notable ones including Beverly Hills Hotel, The Oyster Box Hotel, The Capital Pearls, Cabana Beach Resort and uMhlanga Sands Resort and just further slightly inland in uMhlanga Rocks is the new Radisson Blu Hotel Durban Umhlanga.

Other hotels in uMhlanga, are located in uMhlanga Ridge and include:
 aha Gateway Hotel
 Coastlands Umhlanga Hotel & Convention Centre
 Hilton Garden Inn Umhlanga Arch
 Holiday Inn Express Durban - Umhlanga
 Premier Hotel Umhlanga
 Royal Palm Hotel & Apartments
 Protea Hotel Fire & Ice! by Marriott Durban Umhlanga Ridge
 Regal Inn Umhlanga
 Town Lodge Umhlanga
 Urban Park Hotel and Apartments

Tourist attractions 
The uMhlanga Rocks Promenade (officially known as the Ken O'Connor Promenade, named after former uMhlanga mayor) is a long beach promenade stretching along uMhlanga Rocks from the Durban View Park in the south to the northern viewing deck adjacent the uMhlanga Lagoon Nature Reserve in the north.

Tourist attractions along the uMhlanga coastline and promenade include the uMhlanga Lighthouse and the Whalebone Pier. Furthermore, there are two beaches in uMhlanga, Bronze Beach to the north of the promenade and uMhlanga Main Beach, towards the centre of uMhlanga Rocks, both of which are patrolled by lifeguards throughout the day.

Other attractions in uMhlanga and surrounds include:
 WavePark, a waterpark in Gateway
 Chris Saunders Park, a park in the centre of uMhlanga Rocks with a small lake
 Durban View Park, at the southern end of the promenade
 Mt Edgecombe Country Club, in the neighbouring town of Mt Edgecombe 
 Sibaya Casino and Entertainment Kingdom, located near eMdloti, north-east of uMhlanga
 uMhlanga Lagoon Nature Reserve and Hawaan Forest, north of uMhlanga and on the southern of the Ohlanga River

Infrastructure

Healthcare 
uMhlanga has two hospitals, Busamed Gateway Private Hospital and Netcare uMhlanga Hospital, both of which are private hospitals and are located in uMhlanga Ridge Town Centre.

Roads
uMhlanga has access to three major highways in the eThekwini Metro, the N2, M41 and M4: 

The N2 highway runs past uMhlanga bordering the town to the west and separating it from the bordering suburb of Mount Edgecombe and the mixed-use development of Cornubia. The N2 runs from Durban in the south-west as “Outer Ring Road”, providing access to uMhlanga through the M41 Mount Edgecombe (Exit 182) and the uMhlanga Ridge Boulevard (Exit 183) interchanges, and running northwards towards oThongathi, KwaDukuza and Empangeni.

The M41 highway is a metropolitan freeway linking uMhlanga to Mount Edgecombe and Phoenix in the west and Durban in the south-west (via the M4). The M41 intersects the N2 at the Mount Edgecombe Interchange and borders uMhlanga Ridge and Ridgeside to the north and La Lucia and its adjoining suburb of La Lucia Ridge to the south. Access to the M41 from uMhlanga can be obtained through the Millenium Way off-ramp and the uMhlanga Rocks Drive/Ridgeside Drive off-ramp.

The M4 Ruth First Highway is a metropolitan freeway linking uMhlanga to Durban in the south-east and eMdloti and Ballito in the north-east. The M4 borders between the newer inland suburbs of Herrwood Park and uMhlanga Ridge to the west and the older and established coastal suburb of uMhlanga Rocks to the east and has four interchanges in uMhlanga the Armstrong Avenue, the M41 highway, the uMhlanga Rocks Drive and the Portland Drive off-ramps. The M4 acts as an alternative route to the tolled N2 highway for motorists traveling north towards Ballito. 

Other than the metropolitan routes of M41 and M4, uMhlanga also has access to the M12 and M47. The M41 uMhlanga Rocks Drive is uMhlanga's main arterial road linking uMhlanga Rocks to Durban North in the south via the suburbs of uMhlanga Ridge, La Lucia Ridge, Somerset Park and Sunningdale and the M47 uMhlanga Ridge Boulevard is one of the main roads of uMhlanga Ridge and links uMhlanga to the N2 (limited access to Durban-bound) and the neighbouring development of Cornubia including Cornubia Mall.

Crime

uMhlanga is one of the safest areas in the Greater Durban area. The Durban North precinct which includes a small slice along the coast of Durban North, all of uMhlanga and eMdloti maintained a murder rate of around 7 per 100,000 from 2016 to 2019, about 1/5 of the national average of 35.9 in 2017. Between March 2018 and March 2019, police recorded 3 murders, 136 robberies and 318 residential burglaries. The number of residential burglaries halved between 2014 and 2019 possibly linked to the proliferation of highly visible private security in the area. Certain areas in uMhlanga are very safe, one being Somerset park, a short distance from the Gateway mall.

Demographics 

During apartheid, uMhlanga was a predominately white town, however now it is very diverse with people from various racial backgrounds and ethnic groups. 78.9% speak English as their first language, 9.0% Zulu and 6.12% Afrikaans. There is also a sizable Portuguese population.

The number of people from each racial group increased between 2001 and 2011. The number of white people increased from 11,523 to 12,925 while the percentage dropped from 74.9% to 53.3%. The number of black people increased from 1,770 to 4,147. The number of "Indians or Asians" increased from 1,953 to 6,353. The number of coloureds increased from 141 to 297.

As of the 2011 census, the most black area is the new town centre area which is 24.1% black. The most white area is the northern coastal area of Greater Durban including the uMhlanga village which is 66.9% white. The most Indian area is the woodlands which is 46.0% Indian. The expensive new developments tend to have higher Indian populations than the average for uMhlanga while the lower cost developments tend to have higher Indian and black populations than the average. The older parts of uMhlanga tend to have higher white populations than the average.

Sewage crisis 

Recently in 2022, the eThekwini Metro has faced a massive sewage problem due to failures in its water treatment plants which were further exacerbated by the April floods which destroyed several sewage infrastructure.

uMhlanga is currently one of the worst affected areas in the metropolis with its beaches closed for a long period of time due to the high E-Coli levels found in the ocean water and this had serious repercussions on Umhlanga Rocks' tourism economy.

The sewage crisis has been caused due to a pump station along the Ohlanga River that has been overflowing for several months, however on 23 November 2022, the eThekwini Metropolitan Municipality confirmed that the pump station was repaired in time for the festive season which brings in a lot of income for uMhlanga's economy.

See also 
 Umhlanga Lagoon Nature Reserve

References

External links 

 Official tourism site
 Umhlanga Ridge Town Centre photo gallery
 The Umhlanga Magazine
 Umhlanga's Online Newspaper
 Umhlanga Hotels

Populated places in eThekwini Metropolitan Municipality
Nude beaches